
Gmina Osiek Jasielski is a rural gmina (administrative district) in Jasło County, Subcarpathian Voivodeship, in south-eastern Poland.

Villages
Gmina Osiek Jasielski contains the villages and settlements of Czekaj, Mrukowa, Osiek Jasielski, Pielgrzymka, Samoklęski, Świerchowa, Załęże and Zawadka Osiecka.

Neighbouring gminas
Gmina Osiek Jasielski is bordered by the gminas of Dębowiec, Krempna, Nowy Żmigród and Sękowa.

References
Polish official population figures 2006

Osiek Jasielski
Jasło County